Neutrophil collagenase (matrix metalloproteinase 8, PMNL collagenase, MMP-8) is an enzyme. This enzyme catalyses the following chemical reaction

 Cleavage of interstitial collagens in the triple helical domain. Unlike EC 3.4.24.7, interstitial collagenase, this enzyme cleaves type III collagen more slowly than type I

This enzyme belongs to the peptidase family M10.

See also 
 Collagenase

References

External links 
 

EC 3.4.24